WLOC (AM 1150 / FM 101.7 Translator) is a radio station broadcasting a variety format. Licensed to Munfordville, Kentucky, United States, the station is located Horse Cave, Kentucky, USA and serves surrounding cities and counties.

The station is currently owned by Forbis Communications, Inc.

History
The station signed on the air on June 12, 1956 under ownership of South Central Broadcasting Company of Campbellsville. Stock in the station's parent company was sold to then-mayor of Munfordville Jim Berry in 1960; Berry would sign on WLOC-FM (now WLLI) four years later.

Following Berry's death in 1992, the station went silent due to financial and legal difficulties. The station returned to the air in February 1993 with new 

In 1998, WLOC was acquired by Hart County Communications, while its FM sister station was acquired by Royse Radio of Glasgow. WLOC's current owner, Forbis Communications, acquired the station in December 2003.

In the mid 2010s, the station launched a low-powered FM translator, W269DD, to simulcast its AM radio programming at 101.7 megahertz.

Notable guests at the station
During the early 1990s, southern rock band The Kentucky Headhunters, originally from neighboring Metcalfe County, Kentucky, made regular appearances on WLOC's local talent program, Chittlin' Time. The band also recorded a music video at the station's studio.

References

External links

LOC